This was the first edition of tennis at the Commonwealth Games. The competition was won by top seed, Somdev Devvarman of India, who beat Greg Jones of Australia 6-4, 6-2 in the final.

Medalists

Seeds

Main draw

Finals

Top half

Bottom half

References

Tennis at the 2010 Commonwealth Games